This is a list of ambassadors to Bulgaria. Note that some ambassadors are responsible for more than one country while others are directly accredited to Sofia.

Current Ambassadors to Sofia

See also
 Foreign relations of Bulgaria
 List of diplomatic missions of Bulgaria
 List of diplomatic missions in Bulgaria

References
 

Bulgaria